Jean Jacques Paul Reclus (7 March 1847 – 29 July 1914) was a French physician specializing in surgery. The Reclus' disease is named after him. He was the son of pastor Jacques Reclus and brother of  Élie,  Élisée,  Onésime and Armand Reclus.

He is known for his research of local anesthetics, particularly cocaine.

Selected publications 
 Sur les lésions histologiques de la syphilis testiculaire. Paris 1881 – (with Louis-Charles Malassez)
 Cliniques chirurgicales de l'Hôtel-Dieu, 1888
 Traité de chirurgie, 1890-92 (8 tomes, with Simon-Emmanuel Duplay).
 Cliniques chirurgicales de la Pitié. 1894
 La cocaine en chirurgie, 1895
 L'anesthésie localisée par la cocaïne, 1903
 Les frères Élie et Elisée Reclus [ou, Du protestantisme à l'anarchisme]. - The brothers Élie Reclus and Elisée Reclus (or from Protestantism to anarchism). (by Jean Jacques Paul Reclus, Élie Reclus and friends of Élisée Reclus).

Associated eponym 

"Reclus' disease" is an abscess on the neck that causes a woody hardening of subcutaneous connective tissue. Reclus described the disease in an article titled: Phlégmon ligneux de cou. Revue de Chirurgie, Paris, 1896, 16: 522-531.

References

External links

 Paul Reclus @ Who Named It

1847 births
1914 deaths
French surgeons
French Protestants
Physicians from Paris
University of Paris alumni
Academic staff of the University of Paris
Paul